Cécile or Cecile is a female given name or surname.

People

Given name
 Ce'cile (Cecile Charlton, born 1976), Jamaican musician
 Severin Cecile Abega (1955–2008), Cameroonian author
 Cécile Aubry (1928–2010), retired French film actress and television screenwriter and director
 Princess Cécile of Bourbon-Parma (1935–2021), French humanitarian and political activist
 Cécile Breccia, French actress
 Cécile Brunschvicg (1877–1946), French feminist politician
 Cécile Bruyère (1845–1909), Benedictine nun
 Cécile Chaminade (1857–1944), French composer and pianist
 Cecile de Brunhoff (1903–2003), French storyteller
 Cécile de France (born 1975), Belgian actress
 Cecile of France ( 1097–1145), French princess
 Cécile Delpirou (born 1964), French politician
 Cécile Fatiman ( 1791), voodoo priestess and a figure of the Haitian Revolution 
 Cécile Guillame (1933–2004), French engraver
 Cécile Haussernot (born 1998), French chess player
 Cecile Hulse Matschat (1895–1976), American author, geographer and botanist
 Cecile Jospé (1928–2004), American photographer and watercolorist
 Cecile Licad (born 1961), Filipina virtuoso classical pianist
 Cécile Lignot-Maubert (born 1971), French hammer thrower
 Cécile Manorohanta (21st century), Malagasy politician
 Cécile de Massy (born 1968), member of the Monegasque Princely Family
 Cecile O'Rahilly (1894–1980), Irish scholar
 Cécile Ousset (born 1936), French pianist
 Cécile Paoli (born 1961), French actress
 Cecile Platovsky (20th century), Belgian American fashion designer
 Cécile Reims (1927–2020), French engraver and writer
 Cecile Reynaud (born 1953), volleyball educator
 Cecile Richards (born 1957), former president of the Planned Parenthood Federation of America
 Cécile Rigaux (born 1969), French beach volleyball player 
 Cécile McLorin Salvant (born 1989), American jazz vocalist
 Cécile Schott (21st century), French musician
 Cecile Sinclair (born 1987), Dutch model
 Cecile D. Singer (born  1929), New York politician
 Cécile Untermaier (born 1951), French politician and civil servant
 Cécile Vogt-Mugnier (1875–1962), French neurologist

Surname
 Louis-Pierre Cécile (1905–1995), Ontario lawyer and political figure

Fictional characters
 Cécile Croomy, a minor character in the 2006–2008 anime Code Geass
 Cécile de Maron, a character on the German soap opera Verbotene Liebe
 Cécile Cosima Caminades, a minor character in the 2010 video game Metal Gear Solid: Peace Walker
 Cécile de Volanges, a character in the French epistolary novel Les Liaisons dangereuses by Pierre Choderlos de Laclos
 Cécile, fictional character in Sesame Street
 Cécile, fictional character in Bonjour Tristesse

See also
 Sainte-Cécile (disambiguation)

French feminine given names